The UWN Heritage Championship is a title controlled by, and defended in United Wrestling Network.

On May 5, 2013, Scorpio Sky pinned Shaun Ricker in a rematch from the Red Carpet Rumble tournament, from earlier that day, to win the CWFH Heritage Heavyweight Championship. On August 24, 2014, Hobo challenged Ricky Mandel to a dumpster match, in which he won by putting Mandel in the Dumpster.

Title history

Names

Reigns

Combined reigns 

See also
NWA World Heavyweight Championship
NWA Heritage Championship
UWN Television Championship

References

External links
 "Championship Wrestling from Hollywood" TV series website
 KDOC-TV Los Angeles website
 CWFHollywood MAVTV site
 Picture gallery of CWFH Heritage championship belt
  CWFH Heritage Heavyweight Championship

Heavyweight wrestling championships
Regional professional wrestling championships
United Wrestling Network championships